Zero Gravity Thrill Amusement Park was an amusement park in Dallas, Texas, with rides themed around freefall and simulated flying. Owned by Amusement Management International, Zero Gravity was in operation from 1992 until 2021.

Rides
At the time of closing, the park operated five rides:

Bungee Jump A seven story Bungee tower, with a permanent 7 story platform designed especially for bungee jumping
Skycoaster A 110 foot high hang-gliding/flying simulator that reaches speeds up to 60 mph.
Ejection Seat (Texas Blast Off) Rockets straight up 150 feet into the air, at a speed of zero to 70 mph in 1.2 seconds.
Nothin' But Net Patrons freefall 100 feet into a net below from a 16-story tower.
Skyscraper A towering propeller rotating at 60 mph, reaching 4G speed.

History
Alan Putter formed Amusement Management International in 1992 in Dallas, Texas. The initial company names was Fun Adventures Inc. After doing operations with the original Skycoaster in 1993, installed permanent Skycoasters in Dallas, next to the Malibu Speed Zone sit at I-35 and Walnut Hull, and in FIESTA Texas Theme park in San Antonio, Texas.

In 1992, the ejector seat ride of the Texas blastoff was installed. In 1999 AMI added two new rides to complement the Skycoaster: vertical accelerator and two Skyscrapers.

In 2000, AMI was selected to be the Skycoaster operator for Six Flags Over Texas and in 2001 became the exclusive US operator of the Adrenaline Drop, an unattached freefall experience. The park was acquired by Amusement Management International in 2003.

In 2021, the landlord who owned the site of the park sold the land and the park closed.

References

External links
 Official Website

Amusement parks in Texas
Buildings and structures in Dallas
1992 establishments in Texas
2021 disestablishments in Texas
Tourist attractions in Dallas
Bungee jumping sites
Defunct amusement parks in Texas